Jamides talinga is a butterfly in the family Lycaenidae. It was described by Napoleon Manuel Kheil in 1884. It is found in the Indomalayan realm where it has been recorded from Nias, Sumatra, Borneo and Peninsular Malaysia.

References

External links

Jamides at Markku Savela's Lepidoptera and Some Other Life Forms

Jamides
Butterflies described in 1884